"All for You" is the sole single from the Ace of Base album The Golden Ratio. The single was serviced to radio stations in Germany in mid-August 2010 and was released as a physical single on 10 September 2010.

"All for You" entered and peaked the German charts at number 38.

Music video
The music video was directed by Patric Ullaeus, who had previously directed the music video for the band's 1999 single, "C'est la Vie (Always 21)". Featuring a simplistic black-and-white concept, the video shows the members getting ready for a concert and participating in a photoshoot. The video was released on 27 August 2010.

Track listing
CD single
 "All for You" (Radio Version) – 3:36
 "All for You" (Club Version) – 4:03

Digital download
 "All for You" (Radio Version) – 3:36
 "All for You" (Club Version) – 4:03
 "All for You" (The Sign Dub Remix) – 4:41
 "All for You" (Madhouse Monkeys Remix) – 5:56
 "All for You" (Dance Extended Version) – 4:46
 "All for You" (Michael Mind Project Remix) – 5:34

Charts

References

External links
 Ace of Base official web site
 "All For You" music video

2010 singles
Ace of Base songs
Songs written by Jonas Berggren
Songs written by Ulf Ekberg
2010 songs
Universal Music Group singles
Songs written by Jonas Saeed